Huangfu Ran (714? – 767?) was a Chinese poet of the mid-Tang dynasty. His courtesy name was Maozheng.

Biography

Birth and early life 
He was born around 714. He was a native of Anding (modern-day Jingchuan County, Gansu Province). According to the New Book of Tang, Huangfu was able to compose literature by the age of ten, impressing Zhang Jiuling, who was the chancellor under Emperor Xuanzong at the time.

Political career 
He left government after attaining the post of Zuo Bujue.

Death 
He died around 767.

Names 
His courtesy name was Maozheng.

Poetry 
In literary history, Huangfu is generally considered a poet of the so-called mid-Tang period, which spanned the late-eighth to early-ninth century.

There is an anthology of his poetry, called Tang Huangfu Ran Shiji.

Notes

References

Works cited

External links 
  Books of the Quan Tangshi that include collected poems of Huangfu Ran at the Chinese Text Project:
 Book 249
 Book 250

714 births
767 deaths
Tang dynasty poets
Writers from Xi'an
Poets from Shaanxi
9th-century Chinese poets
10th-century Chinese poets
Three Hundred Tang Poems poets